Maurice Laban (born October 1914 at Biskra, died 5 June 1956 at Boudouane), a pied-noir, was a founding member of the Algerian Communist Party (PCA). In 1936, he joined the International Brigades to fight in the Spanish Civil War.

In the mid-1950s, he was a member of the Combattants de la Libération, the guerrilla group established by the PCA after the outbreak of the Algerian War. Along with Henri Maillot, another European member of the guerrilla group, he was among those killed when an informer betrayed their position to a unit of the French Army. The band were sighted near Lamartine, east of Orléansville, an area which had not previously contained guerillas. They were pursued and attacked outside the Muslim village of Boudouane; seven members of the group were killed, among them Laban and Maillot.

References 

1914 births
1956 deaths
People from Biskra
People of French Algeria
Pieds-Noirs
Algerian Communist Party politicians
International Brigades personnel
People of the Algerian War
Algerian guerrillas killed in action
French Anti-Francoists